The International Council for Evangelical Theological Education (ICETE) is an evangelical Christian organisation of bible colleges. It is a member of the World Evangelical Alliance.

History 
The organization has its origins in a project of regional evangelical theological institute networks in the 1970s. In 1980, it was officially founded by the Theological Commission of the World Evangelical Alliance. In 2015, it had 1,000 member schools in 113 countries.

Governance 
The governance of the organization is ensured by a director and regional directors in the 8 Continental Regions Members.

Affiliations 
The organization is a member of the World Evangelical Alliance.

References

External links
 

Evangelical educational organizations